Claudio Alejandro Vivas (born  12 August 1968), is an Argentine professional football manager and former player who played as a goalkeeper.

Coaching career
Vivas started his management career at Argentinos Juniors and he became famous by working as assistant of Marcelo Bielsa at the Argentina national team and at La Liga club Athletic Bilbao. In 2019 he became the manager of Bolivar, however in late 2020, was fired. In April 2021, Vivas became the head coach of Cusco FC of the Peruvian Primera División.

Personal life
Vivas' older brother Marcelo is also a football manager.

References

External links

1968 births
Living people
Argentine footballers
Footballers from Rosario, Santa Fe
Association football goalkeepers
Newell's Old Boys footballers
Argentine football managers
Argentine Primera División managers
Racing Club de Avellaneda managers
Instituto managers
Club Atlético Banfield managers
Chile national under-20 football team managers
Cusco FC managers
Sporting Cristal managers
Argentinos Juniors managers